Intervision is a studio album by Jimi Tenor. It was released through Warp in 1997. It peaked at number 39 on the Finnish Albums Chart.

Critical reception
Sean Cooper of AllMusic stated that "Intervision blends fat organ leads with horns, raw and treated vocals, and rhythmic and percussive figures drawn from '60s and '70s soul, funk, fusion, and psychedelia, as well as contemporary house, downbeat, and techno."

Track listing

Personnel
Credits adapted from liner notes.

 Jimi Tenor – production
 Caroline Boaden – drums (1, 2, 10, 11)
 Ilkka Mattila – guitar (1, 8, 9)
 Marco Kosonen – trumpet (1, 8, 11)
 Tapani Rinne – baritone saxophone (1, 11)
 Jogi Kosonen – guitar (8)
 Tuomo Puranen – double bass (11)
 DED Associates – design
 Thron Ullberg – photography
 Wolfgang Mustain – photography

Charts

References

External links
 
 
 Intervision at Warp

1997 albums
Warp (record label) albums
Jimi Tenor albums